Stanley W. Drulia (born January 5, 1968) is an American former professional right winger and a scout for the Nashville Predators of the NHL as of December, 2018.

Playing career

Prior to his mid-season hiring in Milwaukee he was the head coach of the Wheeling Nailers of the ECHL where he led the Nailers to a combined 49-35-0-5 record during his tenure there. He was drafted in the eleventh round, 214th overall, by the Pittsburgh Penguins in the 1986 NHL Entry Draft.  He played 126 games in the National Hockey League, all with the Tampa Bay Lightning. He scored 15 goals and 27 assists in the NHL. Drulia was born in Elmira, New York, but grew up in Fort Erie, Ontario.

Drulia played junior ice hockey in the Ontario Hockey League with the Belleville Bulls, Hamilton Steelhawks, and the Niagara Falls Thunder. Drulia holds the OHL record for most career points with 479. Drulia won the Jim Mahon Memorial Trophy as the top scoring right winger, and the Leo Lalonde Memorial Trophy as overage Player of the Year in the 1988–89 OHL season.

While playing in the International Hockey League, Drulia won the Turner Cup playing for the Atlanta Knights and was playoff MVP winning the Norman R. "Bud" Poile Trophy in 1993–94. Drulia won another Turner Cup in 1996–97 with the Detroit Vipers. Drulia won the Poile Trophy again in 1997–98 with the Detroit Vipers, even though the Vipers lost in 7 games to the Chicago Wolves.

Personal life

After his playing career, Drulia has served as head coach of the Orlando Seals of the Atlantic Coast Hockey League, the Augusta Lynx of the ECHL, and the Port Huron Icehawks of the International Hockey League. On July 1, 2010, Drulia was named head coach of the Wheeling Nailers of the ECHL.

Career statistics

Regular season and playoffs

References

External links

1968 births
American men's ice hockey right wingers
Atlanta Knights players
Belleville Bulls players
Canadian ice hockey right wingers
Cape Breton Oilers players
Detroit Vipers players
ECHL coaches
Hamilton Steelhawks players
Ice hockey people from New York (state)
Ice hockey people from Ontario
Knoxville Cherokees players
Living people
Maine Mariners players
New Haven Nighthawks players
Niagara Falls Thunder players
Sportspeople from Elmira, New York
Sportspeople from Fort Erie, Ontario
Phoenix Roadrunners (IHL) players
Pittsburgh Penguins draft picks
Tampa Bay Lightning players
Ice hockey players from New York (state)